Montagano is a comune (municipality) in the Province of Campobasso in the Italian region Molise, located about  north of Campobasso. Montagano rises on one side of the Biferno river, where once stood an ancient Samnite town where inhabitants in the 4th century B.C. sided with Hannibal against Rome.

Montagano is a beautiful and quaint, white stone village surrounded by farmland that borders the following municipalities: Limosano, Matrice, Petrella Tifernina, Ripalimosani.

References

External links
 Official website

Cities and towns in Molise